Abraham Lincoln, Friend of the People  by Clara Ingram Judson is a children's book first published in 1950 which was a Newbery Honor recipient in 1951.

References

1950 children's books
Books about Abraham Lincoln
American children's books
Newbery Honor-winning works
Children's history books